Beautiful Surrender is the eighth album by American Christian worship duo Jonathan David & Melissa Helser, released on September 30, 2016, from Bethel Music through Provident Label Group. Ed Cash handled the production of the album, with Brian Johnson and Joel Taylor serving as executive producers.

Touted as a "vibrant response" to On the Shores, their 2012 album, Beautiful Surrender was the duo's first release with Bethel Music since joining the collective in 2014. The album also included a radio remix of their Dove Award-winning hit single, "No Longer Slaves," as a bonus track. The album became a breakthrough hit for the Helsers, debuting at No. 1 on the Christian music charts in the US and UK as well as attaining mainstream rankings in the US, Australia, Canada and Norway. Following its release, the album spawned "You Came (Lazarus)" as a single, impacting Christian radio in the United States on February 17, 2017.

Background
Jonathan David & Melissa Helser announced that their eighth album, Beautiful Surrender, would be released internationally on September 30, 2016, via Bethel Music and Provident Label Group. With multi award-winning producer Ed Cash handling the project, Beautiful Surrender was recorded in Nashville, Tennessee with instrumentation provided Cageless Birds, a North Carolina-based collective that the duo helped co-found. The duo elaborated on the core message of the album, saying:
Surrender is to cease resistance, yield control and give oneself up to the power of another. When you find the One your heart loves, surrender is a beautiful, effortless fall – not a duty or a task. When Jesus said 'follow me,' they saw everything they ever wanted and joyfully surrendered all they had. What would it look like to truly surrender without reservation, without caution, and give in fully not to an idea of God, but to God himself?

— Jonathan David & Melissa Helser

Promotion
In a bid to promote the album, Jonathan David & Melissa Helser launched the album's pre-order with "Beautiful Surrender", "Catch the Wind" and "Find Me" being released as promotional singles as they were availed for instant download in September 2016.

Singles
After to the album's release, the song "You Came (Lazarus)" was released by Bethel Music to Christian radio in the United States as the lead single from the album, impacting on February 17, 2017.

Critical reception

Matt Collar of AllMusic called the album "a heartfelt production showcasing the husband-and-wife duo's emotive, literate, faith-based sound." Cross Rhythms reviewer Tony Cummings gave the album a perfect ten squares rating, saying that "the worshipping Church has in these two servants an inspiring couple of songsmiths and worship leaders." The album garnered a four star rating from a NewReleaseToday review by Mary Nikkel, describes the sound as being "more like an indie folk-influenced release than most contemporary worship records." Nikkel concluded that "Beautiful Surrender'''s thematic hub is the freedom that comes from full surrender to the true Gospel, the fullness of Jesus's love and grace. Those timeless concepts are expressed in often delightfully unexpected ways both musically and lyrically, establishing the Helser's unique and vital role in the Bethel Music worship family." Reviewing for One Man in the Middle, Tony Cummings rating the album eight-point-three-out-of-ten, is of the opinion that the "whole album is a positive one with a lot of depth to the lyrics and a great combination of vocals." Kelly Meade, in a review for Today's Christian Entertainment, rated the album three and a half stars saying that the overall feel of the album is "one of reflective and worshipful sentiments with heartfelt lyrics and soothing melodies."

Commercial performanceBeautiful Surrender was a breakthrough hit for Jonathan David & Melissa Helser, accruing sales of 9,000 copies in its first week, thus vaulting in at No. 1 on Billboard-issued Christian Albums chart dated October 22, 2016, chronicling the best selling releases of the genre that week. The album also reached No. 54 on the US Billboard 200 chart.

In Australia, Jonathan David & Melissa Helser had their first entry on the mainstream ARIA Albums Chart, with Beautiful Surrender debuting at No. 32 on the chart.

In Canada, the duo also debuted on the all-genre Canadian Albums Chart, with the album peaking at No. 67.Beautiful Surrender'' also became the duo's first entry on the OCC's Official Christian & Gospel Albums Chart in the United Kingdom, debuting at No. 1 for the week ending October 13, 2016.

Track listing

Personnel
Adapted from AllMusic.

 Joel Case – guitar, violin
 Ed Cash – acoustic guitar, electric guitar, engineer, producer, programming
 James Duke – electric guitar
 Chris Estes – director
 Chris Greely – mixing
 Stephen Hart – design, photography
 Jonathan David Helser – acoustic guitar, vocals
 Melissa Helser – vocals
 Brian Johnson – executive producer
 Joe LaPorta – mastering
 Paul Mabury – drums, drums programming
 Buckley Miller – engineer
 Anna Naphtali – photography
 Claire Nunn – cello
 Matt Pierson – bass
 Stephen Price – piano
 Luke Skaggs – violin
 Molly Skaggs – background vocals, piano
 Jake Stevens – electric guitar
 Joel Taylor – executive producer

Charts

Release history

References

External links
  on PraiseCharts

2016 albums
Jonathan David & Melissa Helser albums